Peter Klančar is a Slovenian footballer. He usually plays as left-wing or left-back. Klančar last played for UMF Selfoss, from Iceland.

References

1985 births
Living people
Slovenian footballers
Association football fullbacks
Association football midfielders
NK Ivančna Gorica players
NK Rudar Velenje players
NK IB 1975 Ljubljana players
NK Krka players
Slovenian expatriate footballers
Expatriate footballers in Iceland
Jönköpings Södra IF players
Slovenian expatriate sportspeople in Iceland